Patari is a Pakistani music streaming service founded in February 2015 by Khalid Bajwa, Faisal Sherjan, Iqbal Talaat Bhatti and Humayun Haroon. The site provides Pakistani music and is known as the largest music streaming service in Pakistan.

History

Background 
According to the chief creative officer of Patari, the initial plan was to create an online Pakistani drama serial portal. However, when this did not succeed, the Jang Group’s Chief Strategy Officer Faisal Sherjan, encouraged Patari's founders to focus on music instead.

Launch 
Patari was launched in February 2015 in beta version with a collection of 20,000 songs and 600 artists and was accessible only through invites and later by registration, which led to an increase in access across Pakistan. “We honestly just kept our heads down and kept working on it. Just another day in the life of a start-up we thought, and the next thing we knew, it was everywhere. People were sharing screenshots, making memes, trading tips on how to get invites and reaching out to us to tell us how much they love Pakistani music and Patari” said Khalid Bajwa. Patari was opened to public browsing on 4 September 2015.

Apps 
Patari launched apps for iOS and Android in August 2015. It is planning to launch a Windows OS Windows Mobile app in the near future.

Funding 
On 30 December 2016, Patari received a total amount of US$200,000 in seed funding from the investment firm Sarmayacar.

Weekly singles chart 
Patari Haftanama is a Pakistani top 20 singles chart that is presented every Thursday at Patari.pk.

Legal issues 
In June 2015, EMI Pakistan requested Patari to remove all its content from the website as it held the licenses for over 60,000 Pakistani artists and controlled almost 70% of the total music of Pakistan. Zeeshan Chaudhry, General Manager of EMI Pakistan said: “I am not against Patari. I am against any portal or platform that provides illegal music.” Patari and EMI have since resolved their differences and signed an agreement that places EMI on the Patari platform.

References

External links
 

Music streaming services
 Internet properties established in 2015
 Android (operating system) software
 IOS software
 Online music database clients
 Online music stores of Pakistan
 Symbian software
2015 establishments in Pakistan
 Companies based in Lahore